Lautaro César Carmona Soto (born 26 April 1952) is a Chilean politician. He is leader of the Communist Party of Chile.

References 

1952 births
Living people
21st-century Chilean politicians
Communist Party of Chile politicians
University of Chile alumni
General secretaries of communist parties
Deputies of the LIV Legislative Period of the National Congress of Chile
Deputies of the LIII Legislative Period of the National Congress of Chile